Vampire Weekend is the debut studio album by American rock band Vampire Weekend, released on January 29, 2008 by XL Recordings. The album was produced by band member Rostam Batmanglij, with mixing assistance from Jeff Curtin and Shane Stoneback. Released after a year of building internet buzz, the album showcased the band's unique hybrid of indie pop, chamber music, and Afropop influences.

In the United States, the album debuted at number 17 on the Billboard 200. In the album's 11th week in the UK chart, it peaked at number 15. The album also reached number 37 in Australia. It was accompanied by the singles "Mansard Roof", "A-Punk", "Oxford Comma", "Cape Cod Kwassa Kwassa", and "The Kids Don't Stand a Chance".

The album was ranked as the 5th-best album of 2008 by Time, the 56th-best album of the decade by Rolling Stone and 51st on Pitchforks list of the Top 200 Albums of the 2000s. In 2012, Rolling Stone ranked the album number 430 on its list of "The 500 Greatest Albums of All Time".

Recording history
The album was recorded in a variety of environments including a basement where there was "a good set up for recording drums", a barn, the apartments of two band members, and Tree Fort studio in Brooklyn. The locations bore an effect on the sound that was produced, demonstrated by a session recorded early in 2007 at a barn, which resulted in "really echoey drums". The album draws influence from African pop styles such as soukous and Congolese rumba while incorporating string textures and harpsichords. The group jokingly described this hybrid of indie, afropop, and chamber pop as "Upper West Side Soweto."

In October 2007, the lead singer Ezra Koenig, said that the band had "some of the tracks [...] for a long time", so they were aware of how the album would sound but that it was "just a matter of tightening it up and remixing it a little". Koenig also said that the band was "really excited" and "psyched" about two songs in particular, which were recorded around September 2007, called "I Stand Corrected" and "M79".

The album's cover depicts the chandelier in St. Anthony Hall, a Columbia University semi-secret society. The photo is a Polaroid picture from one of the band's early shows at Columbia.

Release
The album sold over 27,000 copies in the first week of its release, debuting at number 17 on the Billboard 200 and as of 20 January 2010, has sold nearly half a million copies.

The album was ranked as the 5th-best album of 2008 by Time, the 56th-best album of the decade by Rolling Stone and 51st on Pitchforks list of the Top 200 Albums of the 2000s. In 2012, Rolling Stone ranked the album number 430 on its list of "The 500 Greatest Albums of All Time". The album was also ranked 24 on Rolling Stones list of 100 greatest debut albums of all time, citing them for having inspired a wave of indie bands with world music influences, despite largely criticizing the album on its release. Paul Simon has spoken out in favor of the album, responding to the derision of some for perceived similarities to Simon's 1986 album Graceland and confirming that he does not consider the album to contain any stolen work.

Track listing

Personnel

Vampire Weekend
Ezra Koenig – lead vocals, guitar, piano, hand drum
Rostam Batmanglij – organ, Chamberlin, piano, harpsichord, guitar, vocal harmonies, drum and synth programming, shaker
Chris Baio – bass
Christopher Tomson – drums, guitar

Additional musicians
Hamilton Berry – cello
Jonathan Chu – violin, viola
Jeff Curtin – hand drums, shaker
Wesley Miles – vocals
Jessica Pavone – violin, viola
Joey Roth – hand drums

Production
 Rostam Batmanglij – production, string arrangements, engineering, mixing
 Jeff Curtin – engineering, mixing
 Shane Stoneback – engineering, mixing
 Emily Lazar – mastering
 Joe LaPorta – mastering assistance

Artwork
 Annie Reeds – cover photograph
 Rostam Batmanglij – additional photographs, design
 Phil Lee – design
 Asher Sarlin – design

In popular culture
The song "Campus" was used in Gossip Girl and I Love You, Man. "Cape Cod Kwassa Kwassa" was used in Viper Club and a trailer for The Big Sick. "Mansard Roof" was used in Grey's Anatomy and Someone Great. "Oxford Comma" was used in The Chair, Roswell, New Mexico, New Girl, Suits, How I Met Your Mother and I Love You, Man. The song "A-Punk" was used in the 2008 film Step Brothers.

Charts

Weekly charts

Year-end charts

Certifications

References

External links
Vampire Weekend on the XL Recordings website
Vampire Weekend Mp3 Downloads

2008 debut albums
Vampire Weekend albums
XL Recordings albums
Albums produced by Rostam Batmanglij
Worldbeat albums
Chamber pop albums
Pop albums by American artists
World music albums by American artists
Afrobeats albums
Electronic albums by American artists